Wukari is a Local Government Area in Taraba State, Nigeria. Its headquarters is in the town of Wukari on the A4 highway. The Donga River flows through the area and the Benue River forms a boundary with Nasarawa State to the northwest. It has an area of 4,308 km and a population of 241,546 at the 2006 census. The postal code of the area is 670.

Wukari town
The town is the base of the Wukari Federation, a traditional state. It is the home to Jukun people (West Africa)|Jukun people. The local languages  are Jukun (Wapan, Jibu, Nyifon etc). 

Significant Tiv populations are found in surrounding villages like Tse-Ayu and Toho Abanyon though grossly marginalized due to the age-long Tiv-Jukun conflicts.

Education

Tertiary education
The town has tertiary institutions such as:
 Kwararafa University
 Federal University Wukari
 National Open University, Wukari Branch

List of secondary schools in Wukari LGA
 Adigrace College, Byepyi
 Government Day Secondary School
 Mater Dei Nursery and Primary School
 Excel model secondary school
 Federal government college
 The Young Shall Grow Nursery Primary and Secondary School Opposite Correctional Service Wukari

References

Local Government Areas in Taraba State